Margaret Elizabeth Jenkins  (31 October 1905 – 5 September 2010) was an English novelist and biographer of Jane Austen, Henry Fielding, Lady Caroline Lamb, Joseph Lister and Elizabeth I. Elizabeth Bowen said Jenkins was "among the most distinguished living English novelists."

Early life
Jenkins was born on 31 October 1905 in Hitchin, Hertfordshire. Her father, James Heald Jenkins, established the Caldicott School in 1904, which he named for her mother, Theodora Caldicott Ingram.

She attended the Modern School and St Christopher School, Letchworth and the women-only Newnham College, Cambridge from 1921, a constituent college of the University of Cambridge, where she studied English and history, though women were not eligible to receive a degree from the university until 1948.

She took a position teaching English at King Alfred School in Hampstead in 1929. In 1939, when World War II started, she left her teaching position and worked assisting Jewish refugees and London air-raid victims for the Assistance Board. She later worked in government positions for the Board of Trade and the Ministry of Information.

After the war she was a reader for Gollancz, her publisher, and recommend John Braine’s Room at the Top, for publication.

Writing career

Novelist
Through Newnham's principal Pernel Strachey she met Edith Sitwell and Virginia Woolf, who would later call her first novel Virginia Water (1929) "a sweet white grape of a book". She sent her first novel to Victor Gollancz Ltd. When he realised it was the first thing she had written, he immediately gave her a contract for three books.

Her 1934 novel, Harriet (republished by Valancourt Books in 2015), a fictionalised account of the murder of Harriet Staunton whose relatives starved her to death to get to her inheritance, won the Prix Femina. She beat Evelyn Waugh's A Handful of Dust and Antonia White's Frost in May to the prize. The novels Doubtful Joy followed in 1935 and The Phoenix' Nest in 1936. Other novels include Robert and Helen (1944) and A Silent Joy (1992).

The Tortoise and the Hare (1954) is Jenkins' most successful novel. In his review John Betjeman said, "I do not think there is a sentence in this book out of character." It is about a marriage that was deeply troubled despite surface appearances. It was praised by Hilary Mantel in The Sunday Times as showing that Jenkins "seems to know a good deal about how women think and how their lives are arranged". 

Her 1972 novel, Dr. Gully's Story, Jenkins' favourite, retold the story of the 19th-century physician James Manby Gully, whose affair with Florence Bravo, and the subsequent poisoning death of her husband Charles Bravo, led to never-proven suspicions that Gully had committed murder.

Biographer

Jenkins published the first biographies of Lady Caroline Lamb in 1932 and of Jane Austen in 1938. She was involved in the establishment of the Jane Austen Society in 1940 and worked to purchase Austen's home in Chawton where she wrote Emma and other novels, and which later became the site of Jane Austen's House Museum.

Her 1958 biography, Elizabeth the Great, "showed her biographical talents at their most effective" and provided what The New York Times called "a psychological dimension to her portrait that other historians had scanted", an attribute that could also be seen in her 1960 book Joseph Lister. A. L. Rowse said that her biography of Elizabeth I "got nearer to penetrating the secret of the most remarkable woman in history than any other". In her 1961 book Elizabeth and Leicester, Jenkins presented her hypothesis that the violent ends of Anne Boleyn and Catherine Howard had made Elizabeth unable to establish a full sexual relationship with Robert Dudley, 1st Earl of Leicester because she associated sex with death.

Later life
In all, Jenkins wrote a dozen novels and a dozen biographies. She was awarded an OBE in 1981. Her 2004 memoir The View from Downshire Hill recounted her decades of living in a Regency architecture home she bought in Hampstead. She moved into the house in 1939 and decorated it with Regency style furniture that she had acquired inexpensively in the years following World War II from period houses that had been damaged during the war. She would later say that, based on her decor, "people assumed I was comfortably off, instead of being very hard up".

Towards the end of her life, Jenkins told a journalist she had had an affair with the prominent gynaecologist Sir Eardley Lancelot Holland. Holland was the basis of the character Eardley in Jenkins' The Tortoise and the Hare, which Jenkins said was an autobiography "not in fact, but in feeling."

Jenkins died at the age of 104 on 5 September 2010 at a nursing home in Hampstead, London, where she had resided in the years before her death. She never married. She told Virginia Nicholson, "I just shuddered at the idea of childbirth, and then went on to something else."

Bibliography

Novels
 1929 Virginia Water
 1931 The Winters
 1933 Portrait of an Actor
 1934 Harriet (Republished in 2012 by Persephone Books)
 1935 Doubtful Joy
 1936 The Phoenix' Nest
 1944 Robert and Helen
 1946 Young Enthusiasts
 1954 The Tortoise and the Hare (Republished by Virago Books) 
 1963 Brightness
 1968 Honey
 1972 Dr Gully's Story
 1992 A Silent Joy

Biographies
 1932 Lady Caroline Lamb
 1936 Jane Austen: A Biography
 1947 Henry Fielding
 1949 Six Criminal Women
 1955 Ten Fascinating Women
 1958 Elizabeth the Great
 1960 Joseph Lister
 1961 Elizabeth and Leicester
 1978 The Princes in the Tower
 1982 The Shadow and the Light

Memoir
2004 The View from Downshire Hill

Short stories
 1955 "On No Account, My Love"

References

Sources
Author Profile at Persephone Books

1905 births
2010 deaths
Alumni of Newnham College, Cambridge
English biographers
English centenarians
English women novelists
Officers of the Order of the British Empire
People from Hampstead
People from Hitchin
Writers from Hertfordshire
People educated at St Christopher School, Letchworth
Women biographers
20th-century English novelists
20th-century English women writers
20th-century biographers
English women non-fiction writers
Women centenarians